Angelos Charisteas (born 9 February 1980) is a Greek former professional footballer who played as a forward and politician. Since 2019, he works as Sporting Director for Aris.

At club level he played for Aris Thessaloniki, Werder Bremen, Ajax, Feyenoord, Bayer Leverkusen, Schalke 04, Arles-Avignon, and Al-Nassr. In 2004, he won the double with Werder Bremen, earning Bundesliga and DFB-Pokal medals and was also the club's Sportsman of the Year. With Ajax, Charisteas also won the Dutch Cup and the Dutch Super Cup.

Internationally, he was capped 88 times by Greece, scoring 25 goals. He was a member of the UEFA Euro 2004 winning team, scoring three goals, including the winning goal in the final against Portugal, which was considered as the greatest triumph of the nation. He also represented Greece at Euro 2008 and the 2010 World Cup.

In 2019, Charisteas was also a political deputy in his regional department in Greece.

Club career

Aris
After a few years playing for non-league Strimonikos Serron, Charisteas eventually started his professional career with Greek side Aris Thessaloniki. It was during his first season at Aris that Charisteas started making a name for himself, scoring twice in nine matches as they won the Greek second division in 1997–98. Charisteas started well in his first season in the Greek top league and got further noticed when he scored twice in the local derby against Thessaloniki rivals PAOK. The striker made twelve appearances in the Alpha Ethniki – six as a substitute – before a loan at Athinaikos in 1998–99. He returned to Aris the following season and made his European debut in a UEFA Cup defeat by Celta de Vigo at the age of 19. Charisteas was continuously developing and in the 2000–01 season, where he scored seven goals.

Werder Bremen
On 29 January 2002, Charisteas joined Bundesliga side Werder Bremen, signing a four-year contract valid from the summer, having been watched by scouts from a number of Europe's leading sides.

Werder Bremeb Sporting director, Klaus Allofs attested "Angelos is strong in the head, very fast and has good tactical behaviour".

At the club, he scored with regularity between 2002 and 2005.

The transfer fee paid to Aris was reported as €3 million. He had a successful first season scoring nine goals in 31 appearances in the Bundesliga and two goals from four games in the UEFA Cup.

In the 2003–04 season, Werder Bremen won the Bundesliga and the German Cup with Charisteas scoring four goals from 24 appearances.

On 29 September 2004, Charisteas contributed a goal in his side's 2–1 win against Valencia in the Champions League. In total, he scored five goals in 11 matches for Werder Bremen the 2004–05 season.

Ajax
In December 2004, Charisteas moved to the Netherlands to play for Ajax for a reported fee nearly €5 million. Greece manager Otto Rehhagel had publicly urged Charisteas to try to move to another club during the January 2005 transfer window, in order to get more first-team action. Ajax fitted the bill, as they were hoping to find a replacement for Swedish international striker Zlatan Ibrahimović, who had been sold to Juventus. Charisteas made his Ajax debut on 23 January 2005 against FC Utrecht and scored his first goal four days later against SC Heerenveen. However, he only managed three more games all season. Charisteas netted home eight goals in the 2005–06 season, which included a late winner against Vitesse Arnhem. Charisteas missed Greece's crucial match in the World Cup qualifying due to a head injury received after colliding with Arsenal's Kolo Touré in a Champions League match which Ajax lost 2–1.

Under new Ajax manager Henk ten Cate, Charisteas was the 5th striker behind Klaas-Jan Huntelaar, Ryan Babel, Markus Rosenberg, and Rydell Poepon. Ten Cate explained this by saying that Charisteas is a great striker for the 4–4–2 formation, but not for the 4–3–3 formation, which is played for Ajax.

Feyenoord
Despite stating that he was only interested in a move to England or Germany, Charisteas signed for arch-rivals Feyenoord in Rotterdam on 31 August 2006, the final day of the summer transfer window. This move caused a great deal of agitation in Rotterdam with parts of The Legion, stating that they did not want an Ajax player at their club, protesting the move at De Kuip with the chant "Wij willen geen neus." (translated as: "we don't want a nose," nose being derogatory slang for Ajax players) and demanded that chairman Jorien van den Herik resign. Despite the protests, Charisteas made his debut for Feyenoord on 10 September against Sparta Rotterdam and played the full game. He eventually scored his first goal for his new club in his tenth game. Although he seemed to have convinced some fans at a certain point, Charisteas never enjoyed a good relationship with Feyenoord supporters. He finished the season having played a total of 28 games for Feyenoord, netting nine goals.

Nürnberg
On 6 July 2007, 1. FC Nürnberg confirmed a deal with Feyenoord to sign Charisteas on a four-year deal worth €2.5 million. He scored his first two official team goals in a 6–0 victory against fourth division club SC Victoria Hamburg.

At the beginning of the 2009–10 season, he returned to the newly promoted Nürnberg. His first goal of the season came on 12 March 2010, when he scored the winning goal in the 1–2 away win against Hertha BSC, helping Nürnberg to avoid the relegation, before Otto Rehhagel called him up to the Greece national team for the 2010 World Cup.

Bayer Leverkusen
On 2 February 2009, he was loaned out to Bayer Leverkusen until the end of the season, helping the team to reach the final of the German Cup.

Arles-Avignon
On 10 August 2010, Charisteas signed for Arles-Avignon, along with teammate Angelos Basinas. He made his debut on 21 August 2010 in a 1–2 away defeat against Toulouse. Charisteas made a total of seven appearances, scoring no goals, before his contract was terminated on 26 November 2010.

Schalke 04
On 30 January 2011, Schalke 04 formalized his arrival. Charisteas signed a contract on 30 June 2011, until the end of the season. In his debut match for Schalke, he scored the second goal in a 2–1 home win against Eintracht Frankfurt. It was his first touch of the ball, having been on the pitch for only 52 seconds. On 13 April 2011, Charisteas reached the semi-finals of the 2010–11 UEFA Champions League with Schalke, beating in the quarter-finals the defending champion Internazionale, Charisteas replaced the Brazilian Edu in the 32nd minute of the second half. Schalke 04 and Charisteas reached a result never achieved before.

On 21 May 2011, Charisteas won the German Cup with Schalke 04.

Panetolikos
On 27 July 2011, Charisteas joined Panetolikos, newly promoted to the Super League, signing a one-year contract. His first goal of the season came on 14 September 2011 when he scored the winning goal in the 1–0 home win against Asteras Tripolis.

Al-Nassr
After interest from Inter Milan, reported in the newspaper Corriere dello Sport, on 17 February 2013, Charisteas signed a one and a half year contract with Al-Nassr FC. Charisteas played his debut in the final of the 2012–13 Saudi Crown Prince Cup against Al-Hilal FC on 22 February 2013. After 90 minutes penalties had to be taken and Charisteas missed the fourth.

International career
After having been a regular player for the Greek U21 side, Charisteas made his international debut in February 2001 in a 3–3 draw against Russia. His impact was immediate as he scored two of the goals for Greece that day. His prolific goal scoring continued, eventually helping his team qualify for the Euro 2004.

During the victorious Euro 2004 campaign, Charisteas scored three goals: one in the group stage against Spain, one against France in the quarterfinals and the winning goal against Portugal in the final on 4 July, securing himself a permanent place in the history of the sport. The win against Greece was also considered as the greatest triumph of the nation.

His contribution to the team and his impact in the competition was further recognised when he was named in the Euro 2004 All-star Team and he was also nominated for the 2004 Ballon d'Or award, where he finished 11th in votes.

In January 2007, Charisteas told Dutch football magazine Voetbal International that winning Euro 2004 was an unbelievable experience which he would not swap for all the money in the world: "Even in 50 years time, everybody will remember that I scored the goal which made Greece the champions of Europe. We wrote history and my life changed completely at that point."

Charisteas scored three goals for Euro 2008 qualifying rounds, helping Greece to automatically qualify for the competition with two games left. He would go on to be one of the few Greece players who performed well at Euro 2008, scoring the defending champions' only goal of the tournament in the 2–1 defeat to Spain. He scored 4 goals for his country in the 2010 FIFA World Cup qualification.

Charisteas was included in the squad that travelled to South Africa for the final tournament, where he played one game. In that competition, he was the only Greece player to participate in two European Championships and a World Cup (others sharing this distinction: Giourkas Seitaridis, Kostas Katsouranis, Georgios Karagounis and the goalkeeper Kostas Chalkias).

Charisteas received another call-up on 8 October 2011 for the qualification match against Croatia. On 11 October 2011, he scored the winning goal in the 85th minute in Georgia, securing a 2–1 victory which sent Greece automatically to the UEFA Euro 2012 With this goal, Charisteas score in three qualifiers for European Championship and for three consecutive World Cups, became the only player to reach that distinction in the Greece national team.

Charisteas also became the second top scorer for the Greece national team with 25 goals, four fewer than the retired Nikos Anastopoulos.

Style of play
Charisteas played primarily as a target man.

Post-playing career

Sports Directing
On 29 August 2019, Charisteas became sporting director of his former club Aris Thessaloniki. He initially worked loosely as a player agent, and obtained a UEFA B license before registering to acquire further coaching certificates.

Politics
In 2019, Charisteas was also a Political Deputy in his Regional Department in Greece. As a deputy, he was elected to the Regional Parliament of Central Macedonia.

Personal life
During his time as a footballer, Charisteas was known to play the Bouzouki in his spare time.

Career statistics

Club

International

Scores and results list Greece's goal tally first, score column indicates score after each Charisteas goal.

Honours
Werder Bremen
 Bundesliga: 2003–04
 DFB-Pokal: 2003–04

Ajax
 Dutch Super Cup: 2005–06
 Dutch Cup: 2005–06

Bayer Leverkusen
 DFB-Pokal runners-up: 2008–09

Schalke 04
 DFB-Pokal: 2010–11

Greece
 European Championship: 2004

Al-Nassr
 Saudi Crown Prince's Cup: Runners-up 2012–13

Individual
 UEFA Euro 2004: UEFA Team of the Tournament

References

External links

 
 
 
 Angelos Charisteas Interview

1980 births
Living people
People from Serres (regional unit)
Greek footballers
Association football forwards
Greece international footballers
Greece under-21 international footballers
UEFA European Championship-winning players
UEFA Euro 2004 players
2005 FIFA Confederations Cup players
UEFA Euro 2008 players
2010 FIFA World Cup players
Super League Greece players
Football League (Greece) players
Bundesliga players
2. Bundesliga players
Eredivisie players
Ligue 1 players
Saudi Professional League players
Aris Thessaloniki F.C. players
Athinaikos F.C. players
Panetolikos F.C. players
SV Werder Bremen players
AFC Ajax players
Feyenoord players
1. FC Nürnberg players
Bayer 04 Leverkusen players
AC Arlésien players
FC Schalke 04 players
Al Nassr FC players
Greek expatriate footballers
Greek expatriate sportspeople in Germany
Expatriate footballers in Germany
Greek expatriate sportspeople in France
Expatriate footballers in France
Greek expatriate sportspeople in Saudi Arabia
Expatriate footballers in Saudi Arabia
Greek expatriate sportspeople in the Netherlands
Expatriate footballers in the Netherlands
Footballers from Central Macedonia